Atco is an unincorporated community in Waterford Township in Camden County, New Jersey, United States. Though generally considered part of Waterford Township, a small section of the southern edge of Atco is located in Winslow Township.

As of the 2010 United States Census, the population for ZIP Code Tabulation Area 08004 was 12,350.

Atco is the home of the Atco Raceway, and served as the location for the movie Eddie and the Cruisers. In 2005, an episode of Viva La Bam was shot at the raceway. The area is served as United States Postal Service ZIP Code 08004.

History
Atco's name originates from the Atlantic Transport Company, although alternative origins have been proposed, including an indigenous term meaning "Land of many deer." The Atlantic Transport Company of West Virginia placed a substantial order for four large ships with the New York Shipbuilding Corporation, located in Camden, New Jersey, between 1902 and 1903. This event may have contributed to the adoption of the name "Atco" around that time.

Camden and Atlantic Railroad was founded in 1854; it crossed the Pinelands from Camden to Atlantic City. The Raritan and Delaware Bay Railroad was established soon after, linking Atco to communities such as Toms River, Waretown, Atsion and Vineland.

The story of the Atco Ghost is popular in Atco. Legend has it that a young boy was killed by a drunk driver while chasing a ball, and his ghost can now be seen playing on Burnt Mill Road, the same street where the accident occurred, after a motorist honks their horn.

Geography
The town is at the western edge of Wharton State Forest and the Pine Barrens. Atco Lake is a  lake in Atco.

Climate
The climate in this area is characterized by hot, humid summers and generally mild to cool winters.  According to the Köppen Climate Classification system, Atco has a humid subtropical climate, abbreviated "Cfa" on climate maps.

Education
Atco was the site of Assumption School, an elementary school that operated under the auspices of the Roman Catholic Diocese of Camden until it was closed at the end of the 2012–13 school year.

Atco public schools, operated by Waterford Township School District, serve K-6 grade.  Atco Elementary (grades to K-1), Thomas Richards Elementary (grades 2–3) and Waterford Elementary (grades 4–6) serve students from Atco.  Junior high school and high school students from Atco are served by Hammonton Public Schools or parochial schools of their choice.

Transportation

Atco has a train station on the Atlantic City Line, which is operated by NJ Transit. The station is accessible from Route 73 and the White Horse Pike (U.S. Route 30).

Breweries
Brotherton Brewing Company

Wineries
 Amalthea Cellars

Notable people

People who were born in, residents of, or otherwise closely associated with Atco include:
 Kellyanne Conway (born 1967), strategist, and pollster who was campaign manager for Republican presidential candidate Donald Trump in 2016.
 Rey Ramsey (born 1960), social justice entrepreneur, author and former CEO of the One Economy Corporation.
 Jimmy "Superfly" Snuka (1943-2017), former professional wrestler born in Fiji.
 Sally Starr (1923–2013), 1950s celebrity television personality.

References

External links

National Dragster Records shattered, history made in Atco

Unincorporated communities in Camden County, New Jersey
Unincorporated communities in New Jersey
Waterford Township, New Jersey
Winslow Township, New Jersey